The Ilocano ritual of Atang is known as a food offering that is intended to drive away evil and malevolent spirits. It plays an important role in Ilocano culture, as Ilocanos generally believe that there are spirits who live among humans, either of the dead or of other worlds who need to be appeased whenever they are disturbed or offended. This custom of offering food to the deceased is known as alay by the Tagalog and halad by the Cebuanos.    

The most common atang to ward off sickness is a rice cake called sinukat (glutinous rice cooked in coconut milk). A table with an atang meal may be put in a new house. An atang may also be for a harvest offering. Ilocanos may prepare an atang before each meal. The atang may also be called a santorum or panang. The atang meal may be associated in some ceremonies with dance.

Atang is usually performed on Pista ti Natay, or Undas and other special events. Plates of food prepared for an atang consist of delicacies such as suman, dudul, linapet (sticky rice cake or cassava cake with a ground peanut filling, wrapped in banana leaves); baduya, patupat or balisongsong (snacks made from sticky rice or rice flour); busi (caramelized popped rice); linga (black sesame seeds); sinukat or diket, inkiwar (sticky ricewith coconut milk); and bagas (uncooked rice) shaped in a crucifix and topped with fresh eggs. The food may also be accompanied by bua (betel nut) and gawed or paan (piper leaf), apog (lime powder), basi (fermented sugarcane wine), and tabako (tobacco). These offerings are placed in front of a photo of the departed and/or image of Jesus, Mary, or the Holy Family during wakes and anniversaries in homes or in front of the graves, after which the family and/or mourners of the deceased may also offer prayers.   

Ilocanos believe that the soul has not yet left the world of the living during the wake and still needs sustenance, hence the offering of food as they transcend onto the afterlife. It is also believed that the soul returns to the land of the living after the 9-day wake and must be welcomed back. In instances when the deceased appears in a dream or when a family member suddenly experiences unexplainable sickness, atang is performed as an appeasement ritual for the deceased who may have been offended or disturbed. It is also interpreted as asking the deceased to intercede for their loved ones, and thanking them for warning against bad omen through dreams. Clearly, the significance of the atang for the Ilocanos goes beyond the remembrance and honoring of the dead loved ones. It connotes their view of life after death and the relation of the living to the departed.

References

Religious food and drink
Religion in the Philippines
Ilocano culture